Visa requirements for Republic of the Congo citizens are administrative entry restrictions by the authorities of other states placed on citizens of Republic of the Congo. As of 2 July 2019, Republic of the Congo citizens had visa-free or visa on arrival access to 46 countries and territories, ranking the Republic of the Congo passport 96th in terms of travel freedom (tied with the passports of Burundi, Cameroon and Liberia) according to the Henley Passport Index.

Visa requirements map

Visa requirements

Dependent, Disputed, or Restricted territories
Unrecognized or partially recognized countries

Dependent and autonomous territories

See also 

 Visa policy of the Republic of the Congo
 Republic of the Congo passport

References and Notes
References

Notes

Congo, Republic of the
Foreign relations of the Republic of the Congo